Farabee is an unincorporated community in Pierce Township, Washington County, in the U.S. state of Indiana.

History
A post office was established at Farabee in 1859, and remained in operation until 1934. The community was named after Alfred Farabee, a local postmaster.

Geography

References

Unincorporated communities in Washington County, Indiana
Unincorporated communities in Indiana